Salem Abbey was a very prominent Cistercian monastery in Salem in the district of Bodensee about ten miles from Konstanz, Baden-Württemberg, Germany. The buildings are now owned by the State of Baden-Württemberg and are open for tours as the Salem Monastery and Palace.

History

In 1134, a knight named Guntram von Adelsreute, inspired by a sermon held by Bernard of Clairvaux at the Konstanz Minster, donated an estate in the Linzgau region to Bernard's monastic order, the Cistercians. Regardless, in 1137 a party of 12 monks were sent from Lucelle Abbey, in Alsace. These monks combined existing farms with further donations from Guntram in 1138 that gave the new monastery a stable economic base. Its abbot, Frowin, a friend of Bernard, named the monastery Salem, likely as an allusion to Jerusalem.

Finally, in 1155, Frederick I, Holy Roman Emperor, granted Salem imperial immediacy, making it an imperial abbey, and took the abbey under his personal patronage. Salem Abbey profited greatly from the patronage of Frederick's house, the Hohenstaufen, and its territory rapidly expanded through donations and purchases. This rapid growth brought Salem into contention with the Bishop of Constance and with local nobility and peasantry. Under Abbot , however, the monastery continued to expand and secured the protection of the Archbishop of Salzburg in 1201. The Archbishop of Salzburg also gave a saltwork at Hallein to Salem for it to export salt across Lake Constance and further enrich the abbey.

With the beginning of the Great Interregnum in the mid-13th century and the loss of Hohenstaufen protection, Salem began to decline as its possessions were attacked by local rivals and was driven into debt. That alignment brought more attacks on Salem in 1314, led by the Counts of Werdenberg to Heiligenberg, that lasted until Emperor Charles IV granted Salem further political exemptions.

By 1300, 300 choir monks and lay brothers inhabited Salem.

Second Abbey
From 1615 to 1620, Abbot Thomas I demolished the medieval monastery buildings to construct a new complex.

In 1697, every building of the monastery complex except its church was destroyed by fire.

The abbey saw renewed prosperity in the 18th century, however, and was again able to rebuild.

Secularization
In 1802, as part of the process of German mediatization, Salem Abbey was ceded to the Margraviate of Baden by Napoleon to compensate Baden for territories on the Left Bank of the Rhine that had been annexed into France.

In 1920, Prince Maximilian of Baden and the educator Kurt Hahn established the Schule Schloss Salem on the grounds of the abbey.

The House of Baden sold most of the abbey's grounds to the State of Baden-Württemberg in 2009.

Grounds and architecture
A wall was built to enclose the monastery complex around the year 1300. The northern edge of the extant monastery is made up by service buildings that house a stable, mill, bakery, blacksmithy, prison, and also include a wine cellar and a tithe barn.

The ceilings of the rebuilt cloister are adorned with stucco and frescoes depicting the life of Bernard of Clairvaux.

Salem Minster
Construction of the Salem Minster began in 1299 and it was not finished until 1414, when the Archbishop of Salzburg consecrated it.

Palace
Before the abbey was secularized, the Prälatur was the residence of Salem's abbots. Afterwards, it was a residence of the House of Baden.

Citations

References

Online references

External links

Salem Monastery and Palace - official site
School Schloss Salem website
Salem overview

Imperial abbeys disestablished in 1802–03
Monasteries in Baden-Württemberg
Cistercian monasteries in Germany
Religious organizations established in 1136
Christian monasteries established in the 12th century
Historic house museums in Baden-Württemberg
Religious museums in Germany
Bodenseekreis